Parole boards in the United States do not have uniform titles, nor uniform powers or jurisdictions.  In many cases their traditional powers have been limited by "determinate sentencing" and other reform legistion. 

This list is intended to be exhaustive of federal and state-level parole and pardon agencies.  It does not include local state agencies, nor governor's offices where the pardon function is not in a separate agency. In some cases the pardoning and paroling function are not within the same agency. As of 2018, sixteen states had abolished the parole function in favor of "determinate sentencing". Wisconsin, in 2000, was the last state to abolish that function. However, parole boards in those states continue to exist in order to deal with imprisoned felons sentenced before the imposition of "determinate sentencing".

Federal
 United States Parole Commission
 Naval Clemency and Parole Board

States
 Alabama Board of Pardons and Paroles
 Alaska Department of Corrections Parole Board
 Arizona board abolished as of 1994, duties transferred to the Community Corrections Division of the Arizona Department of Corrections
 Arkansas Parole Board
 Connecticut Board of Pardons and Paroles
 Georgia State Board of Pardons and Paroles
 Idaho Commission of Pardons and Parole
 Illinois Parole and Pardon Board replaced by the Illinois Prisoner Review Board
 Kentucky Parole Board
 Minnesota Board of Pardons
 Nebraska Board of Pardons
 Nevada Board of Parole Commissioners
 New Hampshire Department of Corrections#Adult Parole Board
 New Jersey State Parole Board
 New Mexico Parole Board
 New York State Division of Parole
 Oklahoma Pardon and Parole Board
 Pennsylvania Board of Probation and Parole
 Rhode Island Parole Board
 South Carolina Department of Probation, Parole, and Pardon Services
 Tennessee Board of Parole
 Texas Board of Pardons and Paroles
 Utah Adult Probation & Parole
 Virginia Parole Board
 Wisconsin Parole Commission
 Wyoming Board of Parole

Notes and references

Parole in the United States